The 5th Hussar Regiment (5e régiment de hussards or 5e RH) was a French Hussar regiment.

Formation under the Ancien Régime

The 5th Hussar Regiment was formed under the Ancien Régime. It was the last regiment created under the monarchy. It particularly distinguished itself during the American Revolutionary War.
 1 September 1778: Creation of the Navy's foreign volunteer corps, mainly composed of eight mixed legions to participate in the war against Great Britain. It was created by the naval minister Gabriel de Sartine, and 'propriétaire' status had been granted to Armand Louis de Gontaut, duc de Lauzun. The corps comprised three legions, each consisting of four companies of grenadiers, chasseurs and fusiliers, plus artillery, cavalry and pioneer detachments. As with other 18th century "legions" the intention was to create a miniature army which could campaign as a single entity. As indicated by the title, the corps was recruited primarily from  German, Polish and Irish mercenaries. As the Volontaires Etrangers de la Marine, the new corps saw active service in Senegal in December 1778 as well as in the West Indies.
 5 March 1780: The 2e Légion des Volontaires Étrangers de la Marine changed its name to be the 2e Légion des Volontaires Étrangers de Lauzun, or the Légion de Lauzun. This unit was present in the United States of America from July 1780 to May 1783.
 When in early 1781 the Expédition Particulière was being organized, most of the 1778 organization had been deployed to overseas posts. What remained in France,  under the duc de Lauzun, was reconstituted as the Volontaires-étrangers de Lauzun, and was part of Rochambeau's expedition.
 14 September 1783: The unit became known as the Régiment de Hussards de Lauzun.

Lauzun's Legion
Lauzun's Legion was made up of infantry, cavalry and artillery components (one company of grenadiers, one company of infantry, two squadrons of Hussars, and one company of gunners) and were recruited largely from foreign mercenaries.  After being posted to Senegal and the West Indies, Lauzun's Legion served in the American War for Independence. The corps' principal engagements were at White Plains in 1781, and at the Siege of Yorktown in 1781.

The American War Of Independence
When the Legion arrived in America, they recruited from foreigners, mainly Hessian deserters; there were complaints about their conduct. Rochambeau sent Brigadier General Marquis de Choisy with Lauzun's Legion in July 1780, as they marched from Rhode Island to Head of Elk, Maryland, traveled by water to Alexandria, Virginia, and marched to Glouster Courthouse. They spent the winter in Lebanon, Connecticut.

The Légion de Lauzun became famous during the Siege of Yorktown, mainly before Gloucester on 3 October 1781, where they forced a British foraging party, led by Banastre Tarleton, back to  their defensive lines, with a loss of 50 men. The legion stayed in the United States of America, first in Hampton, Virginia, then in February 1782 in Charlotte Court House, Virginia, before they were moved in July 1782 to New York. The legion left the United States in May 1783.

In Connecticut
In December 1780, two dozen Hussar horsemen deserted and discharged themselves from their winter quarters in Lebanon and fled into the woods to the south. The Legion itself may have wintered in Trumbull, Connecticut, according to Huldah Hawley, who said she cooked for the French for fear they would kill her because her husband was a known Tory. Lauzun's Legion or "Hussars" encamped in present-day Abraham Nichols Park in Trumbull from June 28 to June 30, 1781. The Legion, an advance party, was ordered to protect the exposed flank of the main army and stayed  ahead of and to the south flank of the main French army while encamped in Newtown. The army was marching in the Washington–Rochambeau Revolutionary Route south to reinforce American troops under the command of General George Washington at the Siege of Yorktown. French coins have since been found near the site of their camp in Abraham Nichols Park.

At Yorktown
The legion was at Gloucester, Virginia, during the Siege of Yorktown.  On October 4, 1781, French and British cavalry skirmished at Gloucester. The British cavalry commander, Banastre Tarleton, was unhorsed, and the Lauzun's Legion drove the British within their lines, before being ordered to withdraw by the Marquis de Choisy.  The Legion suffered three Hussars killed, and two officers and eleven Hussars wounded.  Fifty British were killed or wounded, including Tarleton.

After the battle

In December 1782, the Legion moved to Wilmington, Delaware. On 18 March 1783, in Delaware, their cash payroll was stolen but recovered.  On 9–11 May 1783 the Legion embarked from Wilmington on five vessels, la Goire, la Danaë, l"Astree, l'Active, and Le St. James, arriving at Brest, France, about 11 June. On 5 October 1783, the Legion's two artillery companies left Baltimore on the Duc de Lauzun, and the Pintade. The ships, guarded by two French frigates, arrived in Brest on 10 November.  However, many soldiers mustered out in America, or deserted.

West Indies
When the Legion transferred to America, it left behind its two fusilier companies. These companies transferred to the West Indies. In January–February 1782 they accompanied French naval Captain Armand Guy Simon de Coëtnempren, Comte de Kersaint, with his 32-gun flagship Iphigénie and four lesser ships to Demerara, where they met with little opposition. The detachments from the Regiment Armagnac and the Legion launched an assault against the British garrison compelling Governor Robert Kinston and his army detachment from the 28th Regiment of Foot to surrender. As a result, Essequebo and Berbice also surrendered to the French on 1 and 5 February.

Return to France

The Régiment des Hussards de Lauzun, number 6 (a regular hussar regiment), was officially created on 14 September 1783 in Hennebont, when the Légion de Lauzun des États-Unis returned. Lauzun remained its proprietor until the French Revolution started.

The French Revolutionary Wars
When the revolutionary government declared war on Austria, the regiment fell completely apart as the majority of its officers deserted and handed the regiment's funds, supplies, and records over to the enemy. Subsequent restructuring included: 
 1 January 1791: All regiments were renamed by their type and numbered by their seniority. The unit became 6th Hussar Regiment.
 June 1793: The unit was renamed the 5th Hussar Regiment by Decree of 4th June 1793 after the majority of the soldiers moved to the 4th Hussar Regiment.

The Napoleonic Wars

 During the Revolutionary and Napoleonic wars the regiment served in numerous battles, most notably: 1792: Valmy and Jemmapes.(As 6th Regiment of Hussars); 1800: Mosskirch, Biberach, Kirchberg and Hohenlinden; 1805: Austerlitz; 1806: Jena; 1807: Eylau and Konigsberg; 1809: Eckmuhl and Wagram; 1812: Borodino, Moskawa, and Berezina; 1813: Bautzen, Leipzig, and Hanau; 1814: Arcis-sur-Aube; 1815: Ligny, Waterloo, and Versailles, with Battle Honours for Jemmapes, Jena, Eckmuhl, La Moskowa, and Hanau.
 12 May 1814: The 5th Hussar Regiment became the Régiment des Hussards d'Angoulême
 22 April 1815: The regiment became again the 5th Hussar Regiment
 30 November 1815: The 5th Hussar Regiment was dissolved and recreated under the name of the Régiment des Hussards du Bas Rhin

The 19th Century
 1825: Renamed again to the 5th Regiment of Hussars
 Involved in the French intervention in Mexico

The Modern Age
 1921: Dissolved
 1951: Recreated in Koblenz as the 5th Hussar Regiment
 1976: Transformed into the 3rd Dragoon Regiment
 1980: Recreated as the Reserve Regiment of the 5th Hussar Regiment

See also
Armand Louis de Gontaut
5th Hussar Regiment
P Street Bridge

References

External links
Lauzun’s Legion Reenactors
Lauzun's Legion's Encampment in Wilmington DE in 1782-1783
Commemoration of the 1780 French Encampment of Lauzun's Legion at Lebanon, Connecticut, 30 September - 2 October 2005
Robert A. Selig, The Duc de Lauzun and his Legion
Légion's Lauzun on the Cincinnati French Society site

20th-century regiments of France
Cavalry regiments of France
Disbanded units and formations of France
Regiments of France in the French Revolutionary Wars
Regiments of the Bourbon Restoration
Regiments of the First French Empire
Regiments of the French First Republic
Regiments of the July Monarchy
Military units and formations disestablished in 1992
Military units and formations established in 1791